View history
Ronald Lee Curry Jr. (born July 12, 1993) is an American professional basketball player for ESSM Le Portel of the French LNB Pro A. He played college basketball for James Madison.

Professional career
In August 2016, he signed his first professional contract with Slovenian club Krka. He spent the 2019–20 season with Falco KC Szombathely, averaging 10.2 points, 2.7 rebounds, 3.2 assists and 1.3 steals per game. On August 12, 2020, Curry signed with Alba Fehérvár.

On August 6, 2021, he signed with VEF Rīga of the Estonian-Latvian Basketball League and Champions League.

On May 25, 2022, he signed with ESSM Le Portel of the French LNB Pro A.

Personal life
Curry grew up in Pennsauken Township, New Jersey and attended Paul VI High School.

References

External links
 Eurobasket.com profile
 FIBA profile
 ESPN profile
 REALGM profile

1993 births
Living people
21st-century African-American sportspeople
African-American basketball players
American expatriate basketball people in Germany
American expatriate basketball people in Hungary
American expatriate basketball people in Slovenia
American men's basketball players
Basketball players from New Jersey
BK VEF Rīga players
ESSM Le Portel players
James Madison Dukes men's basketball players
People from Pennsauken Township, New Jersey
Point guards
Shooting guards
Sportspeople from Camden County, New Jersey
Telekom Baskets Bonn players